The sharktooth moray eel (Gymnothorax maderensis) is a moray eel found in the eastern and western Atlantic Ocean.

References

maderensis
Fish described in 1862